is a 2019 Japanese film directed by Shinsuke Sato and produced by Sony Pictures Japan. It is an adaptation of the manga series of the same name, created by Yasuhisa Hara and published by Shueisha. The screenplay was written by Tsutomu Kuroiwa, Shinsuke Sato and Yasuhisa Hara. Kento Yamazaki, who starred in a 3-minute short of the same name released in 2016, reprises his role as the film's protagonist with a supporting cast that includes Ryo Yoshizawa, Kanna Hashimoto, Masami Nagasawa, Kanata Hongō and Takao Osawa. The film portrays the life of Li Xin, a general of Qin, from his childhood as an orphan through his military career during the Warring States period of ancient China.

The film was released nationwide on April 19, 2019. It was screened in North America by Funimation in Q3 2019.

Plot
Orphaned by war, Xin is sold as a slave to a small village, where he befriends Piao, another slave. Growing up, Xin and Piao train together, dreaming of escaping their low statuses and eventually becoming great generals. One day, Chang Wen Jun visits their village in search of soldiers to aid the king Ying Zheng, but he will only accept Piao. A few days later, a mortally wounded Piao appears at Xin's house, warning him that Ying Zheng's brother, Cheng Jiao, has started a power struggle and urging him to go to a meet-up point marked on a map he gives him. Xin is forced to flee as his village is set on fire and the villagers are murdered by Cheng Jiao's army.

At the meet-up point, Xin finds Ying Zheng, but they are ambushed by an assassin. Xin realizes that Piao was accepted into the army to serve as Ying Zheng's body double due bearing a resemblance to him. After the assassin is killed, the two escape through a mountain path with help from Heliao Diao, a Mountain Tribe child who had accompanied the bandits who had previously ambushed Xin. As the three reach the bamboo forest, they are attacked by another assassin. Despite blaming Ying Zheng for Piao's death, Xin defeats the assassin, but he is poisoned by one of his darts. The three take refuge at an ancient summer resort to help Xin recuperate, while Xin learns Piao had voluntarily sacrificed himself to serve Ying Zheng and about Ying Zheng's bitter rivalry with Cheng Jiao.

Ying Zheng's remaining army finally arrive at the summer resort, including Chang Wen Jun, who was previously assumed to have been killed by Wang Qi. The army is outnumbered by Cheng Jiao's army of 80,000 soldiers, while Ying Zheng admits that Lü Buwei, the only person who can outmatch him, is also after the throne. Ying Zheng's army resorts to seeking help from the Mountain Tribe, a former ally of the Qin royal family that had been betrayed centuries ago. On the way, they are captured by the Mountain Tribe and brought forth to the chieftain, Yang Duan He. Yang Duan He orders Xin to be beheaded to test Ying Zheng's loyalty, but Xin's dedication to Ying Zheng's goal and mannerisms impress her, after which she announces that the Mountain Tribe will be affiliated with the Qin royalty again.

Ying Zheng's army arrives at the royal palace disguised as part of the Mountain Tribe, under the pretense of helping Cheng Jiao fight against Lü Buwei. Jie Shi, Cheng Jiao's advisor, allows only 50 people inside, and 10 of them to meet with Cheng Jiao. Inside, Ying Zheng initiates an attack, while Xin, Diao, and Bi use the underground passageway to reach the throne room and assassinate Cheng Jiao. Xin's group is intercepted by Zuo Ci, Ying Zheng's former general, who sends Lang Kai the Executioner after them. Xin kills Lang Kai with the help of the Mountain Tribe, and when they reach Cheng Jiao's room, Zuo Ci defeats Xin's group. Xin's memory of Piao and belief in his own dreams pushes him to continue and he kills Zuo Ci. Cheng Jiao's council flees, but Diao gouges out Jie Shi's eye with a dart and is stabbed by him before he dies. While Diao is safe thanks to wearing armor, Cheng Jiao uses their distraction to escape.

In the courtyard, Cheng Jiao confronts Ying Zheng, but is quickly defeated. Ying Zheng spares him, but he beats him down to punish him for the suffering he caused. In the midst of this, Wang Qi and his army appear in the courtyard, where he inquires Ying Zheng what he will do as king, under the condition that he will behead him if he does not provide a satisfactory answer. Ying Zheng vows that he plans to unite China under the Warring States period, even using force as means to ensure that there would be peace in the future. Satisfied with his answer, Wang Qi allies with Ying Zheng and orders Cheng Jiao's remaining army to retreat. With the battle won, Xin revels in the glory of making both his and Piao's dreams come true.

Cast
 Kento Yamazaki as Xin
 Ryo Yoshizawa as Piao and Ying Zheng
 Kanna Hashimoto as He Liao Diao
 Masami Nagasawa as Yang Duan He
 Kanata Hongō as Cheng Jiao
 Shinnosuke Mitsushima as Bi
 Masahiro Takashima as Lord Changwen
 Takao Osawa as Wang Qi
 Jun Kaname as Teng
 Shinnosuke Abe as Ba Jiō
 Wataru Ichinose as Ta Jifu
 Masaya Kato as Jie Shi
 Renji Ishibashi as Si Shi
 Tak Sakaguchi as Zuo Ci
 Takashi Ukaji as Wei Xing
 Ami 201 as Lang Kai
 Yuhei Ouchida as Dun
 Jun Hashimoto as Muta
 Naomasa Musaka as village chief
 Motoki Fukami as Vicious Scarlet

Production
Production took place in Japan, and the filming occurred in China and Japan during April 2018.

On April 18, 2018, Hara tweeted a movie-ized cover illustration promoting the manga's move to the big screen. A trailer was released by Sony Pictures on January 16, 2019. The film was released nationwide on April 19, 2019.

An English-subtitled trailer was screened at SXSW 2019 in March, where lead actor Kento Yamazaki had paid a courtesy call to the vice president of Sony Pictures International. Funimation later announced that they were holding screenings of the film during the second quarter of 2019.

Reception

Box office
The film earned 729 million Yen (6.17 million USD) in its opening three day weekend, selling over 500,000 tickets. As of June 16, 2019,  the film earned 

Home media
An English-language subtitled trailer was released by Toho in March to promote a North American release. Funimation Films announced that it acquired the license for an American and Canadian release in the summer. The film is expected to be released in North America on August 16.

Critical reception
On Rotten Tomatoes the film has an approval rating of  based on reviews from  critics.

Awards and nominations

Sequels

On May 28, 2020, a sequel film was announced to be in production. Shinsuke Sato is returning as director; Kento Yamazaki, Ryō Yoshizawa, and Kanna Hashimoto are returning cast members. Titled Kingdom II: To Far Lands (キングダム II: 遥かなる大地, Kingudamu II: Harukanaru Daichi e), it was released in Japan on July 15, 2022 and generated 5.16 billion yen in box office revenue within Japan.

A third sequel has been confirmed for development with the director, Shinsuke Sato, and much of the cast returning. Titled Kingdom III: Flame of Destiny ( キングダム3 運命の炎, Kingudamu III: Unmei no Hōno), it will be released on July, 28, 2023.

References

External links
 

2010s Japanese films
Cultural depictions of Qin Shi Huang
Fictional dictators
Films directed by Shinsuke Sato
Films scored by Yutaka Yamada
Films set in China
Films set in the 3rd century BC
Films set in the Warring States period
Films shot in China
Films shot in Japan
Funimation
Fiction about government
Live-action films based on manga
Monarchy in fiction
Toho films